The Members Church of God International (Tagalog: Mga Kaanib Iglesia ng Dios Internasyonal), abbreviated as MCGI, is an international Christian religious organization with headquarters in the Philippines. It is popularly known in the Philippines as Ang Dating Daan (abbreviated as ADD), the title of its flagship radio and television program and the longest-running religious program in the Philippines which was hosted by Eli Soriano, MCGI's "Overall Servant" (former title: "Presiding Minister") until his death in 2021.

In compliance with government regulations, Eli Soriano registered the group with the Securities and Exchange Commission (SEC) as Ang Mga Kaanib sa Iglesia ng Dios Kay Kristo Hesus, Haligi at Saligan ng Katotohan, sa Bansang Pilipinas (English: Members of the Church of God in Christ Jesus, Pillar and Ground of Truth in the Philippines). In 2004, its registered name was changed to "Members Church of God International" (Tagalog: Mga Kaanib Iglesia ng Dios Internasyonal) in line with the church's overseas expansion. The group is known in Hispanophone and Lusophone countries as Miembros de la Iglesia de Dios Internacional and Membros da Igreja de Deus Internacional respectively, shortened as MIDI.

MCGI is not related to the many Church of God groups that descended from the Barney Creek Meeting House revival of the late 19th century in the United States.

History

The Members Church of God International in the Philippines rooted from a similar denomination, the Iglesia ng Dios kay Cristo Jesús, Haligi at Suhay ng Katotohanan (Church of God in Christ Jesus, Pillar and Support of the Truth) which was first headed by Nicolas Antiporda Perez in Pulilan, Bulacan, Philippines in 1928. It started as a small group with less than a hundred believers.

Perez' leadership
On December 10, 1936, the church was registered with the Philippine government by Perez as Presiding Minister with a Central Office in Natividad St., Pasay (then part of Rizal). Since then, church workers were being sent to nearby provinces around Manila.

Perez led the church from 1928 until the time of his death in May 1975. In 1969, Perez gave Soriano an identification card bearing the "Minister" title. Before Perez died, he did not lay his hands on a successor. After the death of Perez, Soriano outlined the topics being taught to the members, in order for them not to lose hope. The members thought Perez prepared those topics before he died but other workers in the church knew, however, that it was written by Soriano.

On July 11, 1975, members of the Board of Trustees, including Soriano, allowed Levita Gugulan, the Secretary General, to act as "temporary" presiding officer until such time a new presiding officer is elected, in compliance to the Securities and Exchange Commission (SEC). However, Gugulan led the church permanently.

Schism and legal battle
Soriano and other members believe women are not allowed to rule over the church according to the Bible. In their belief that the group formerly led by Perez already went astray in the teachings of God, Soriano left the group led by Gugulan, together with some members who testified that they have heard Perez preach that it is strictly prohibited in the Bible for a woman to rule over the Church of God.

Soriano registered "Mga Kaanib sa Iglesia ng Dios kay Kristo Hesus Haligi at Saligan ng Katotohanan" (Members of the Church of God in Christ Jesus, the Pillar and Ground of Truth) with the Securities and Exchange Commission. Soriano used the word "saligan" (ground or foundation) in reference to the Greek word "ἑδραίωμα" (hedraióma), and not "suhay" (brace), which is used by Gugulan's group.

Gugulan's group filed a petition with the SEC to compel Soriano to change the registered name of his group. During the pendency of the case, Soriano registered "Ang Mga Kaanib sa Iglesia ng Dios Kay Kristo Hesus, Haligi at Saligan ng Katotohanan sa Bansang Pilipinas" to comply with the SEC. In 1996, the SEC En Banc favored Gugulan's petition and it was affirmed by the Court of Appeals in 1999. In December 2001, the Supreme Court First Division denied Soriano's appeal with finality. Pending Supreme Court's decision, Soriano reserved a new corporate name in 1996 containing transliterated Hebrew words and have it finalized in 2004 with the current name.

Soriano's leadership

In the 1970s, missionary works started and were first in the towns of Pampanga and then, the neighboring provinces of Bulacan, Rizal, Nueva Ecija, Bataan, and Metro Manila. In the last quarter of 1980, the church launched the radio program Ang Dating Daan. Through the local radio station DWWA 1206 kHz, the radio program was heard in many parts of the Philippines. The program became popular because of its unique live question-and-answer portion. In 1983, the program kicked off its national television appearance through IBC Channel 13. Ang Dating Daan as a program in radio made its stint in television through RJTV 29, PTV 4, SBN 21, and now UNTV.

On January 13, 2004, the church registered "Members Church of God International" as its corporate name in the SEC. In the same year, the church tapped GlobeCast for The Old Path (TOP) Channel satellite broadcast in the United States of America and Canada.

On January 7, 2006, the first live Bible exposition in the United States was held in Los Angeles, California. In 2008, Bible Expositions were conducted in the continent of Oceania bringing forth the first congregation in Papua New Guinea. In the same year, congregations were established in Ghana, West Africa as a result of a series of Bible studies in Africa. The early months of 2009 saw the Church introduced in Latin America.

Organization

The Members Church of God International as an organization is managed by its Central Administration under the Workers Ministry. It is composed of the Overall Servants (Tagalog: Mga Lingkod Pangkalahatan), council of Helpers of the Ministry (Tagalog: Mga Katulong ng Pangangasiwa abbreviated as "KNP") and Church Workers (Tagalog: Mga Manggagawa).

Overall servants

Bro. Eli Soriano was the Overall Servant (Tagalog: Lingkod Pangkalahatan) to the church (formerly called as presiding minister or Tagapangasiwang Pangkalahatan in Tagalog) until February 2021. His deputy, Bro. Daniel Razon is the Assistant Overall Servant (Tagalog: Pangalawang Lingkod Pangkalahatan, formerly called as vice presiding minister or Pangalawang Tagapangasiwang Pangkalahatan in Tagalog).

They supervise the entire organization, implement policies and projects, teach the helpers of the ministry (formerly called as assistants to the administration, ministers-in-charge, abbreviated as "MIC" and officers-in-charge, abbreviated as "OIC") and church workers all the doctrines of Christ and oversee rightful execution of duties and responsibilities assigned to them, including other officials in various church ministries and organizations.

The overall servant prepares the outline of biblical topics (Tagalog: paksa) and preach sermons. A part of it will be delivered and discussed by his deputy. Preaching of biblical topic is done by the Overall Servants, either live or recorded, which is being aired in all locale church congregations. They also personally take time to resolve spiritual and personal problems of members every Thanksgiving gathering, during the consultation period.

Helpers and workers
Helpers of the ministry supervise a church "Division" (Tagalog: Dibisyon) referring to a geographical region in the Philippines or group of countries in a continent such as Asia Oceania. Area Servants (Tagalog: Lingkod Pampook, formerly called as Tagapangasiwang Pampook and abbreviated as "TP") oversee a church "District" (Tagalog: Distrito) referring to one Philippine province. Assigned Church Workers administer various church services such as Prayer Meetings, Worship Services, Indoctrination Sessions, Bible Studies, Bible Expositions, and Thanksgiving in local congregations. They are allowed to communicate official memorandum signed by the Overall Servants and preside over matters and activities concerning the local church. Brethren can personally seek spiritual or personal advice from Workers, who were trained during ministerial classes, in giving Biblical advice and recommendations.

Membership

The church keeps a formal number of members but does not openly reveal it. In 2015, the church gained more than 20,000 new members through regular and mass baptisms.

As of 2015, the church has established more than 1,360 congregations in the Philippines and abroad, up from a total of 1,280 locales reported in 2014.

Congregations are grouped geographically by divisions, districts and zones mainly the Philippines, South America, North America, Canada, Asia Oceania, Middle East, Europe, Israel and Africa Division. The official website of the church reported its presence in 46 countries and territories as of 2010.

Since its arrival in South America in 2009, the church sees a growing number of locales in the continent. As of 2015, it reported 237 established locales in Brazil, including those in Curitiba, Porto Alegre, Rio de Janeiro, São Paulo, and Florianópolis.

Members not living in accordance with the church's teachings may be excommunicated or expelled, from the church. Members are required to be modest in dress and grooming. Women are prohibited from cutting their hair and wearing expensive jewelry and denim pants, and men are prohibited from having long hair. They are strictly prohibited from drinking alcohol, smoking cigarettes, using drugs, and gambling.

Propagation

The Members Church of God International believe that an important duty and obligation of the members of the church is to propagate the gospel on earth until the consummation of the ages. Eli Soriano began his nightly town-to-town preaching in the 1970s but eventually realized that his life is not enough to reach the entire Philippines. In the 1980s he decided to use emerging media such as radio and television.

In October 1980, it initially launched the Ang Dating Daan program hosted by Bro. Eli Soriano and Bro. Daniel Razon and later on Philippine television in February 1983. The program is now being broadcast in more than 70 countries, in five languages over terrestrial television, radio, internet and carried by at least seven satellites across the globe.

Currently, the church programs reach in six inhabited continents via TV Verdade, TV La Verdad, The Truth Channel and UNTV using the services of at least seven satellite providers.

Radio broadcast

The 30-minute AM radio program of Ang Dating Daan began in 1980. In 1999, the program is heard nationwide through DZRH, RMN and 100 Radyo Natin stations. Since 2011, the radio program is now on its home station UNTV Radyo La Verdad 1350.

Television broadcast
The program started its television debut in February 1983 on IBC-13. Later, it was transferred to RJTV-29, PTV-4 and SBN-21. In 2004, UNTV-37 became its permanent home. UNTV 37 is a free-to-air network and also carried by major cable networks and direct-to-home providers.

Between 2010 and 2011, the church reached the airwaves of India, Uruguay, Argentina, Bolivia and Portugal by acquiring timeslots in local television channels. To further boost viewership, it acquired a 30-minute slot on Fox Channel which is carried by 50 cable networks in Central America and South America. Later, the church acquired timeslots in Chile, Paraguay, Peru, Ecuador, Colombia, Venezuela, Honduras, Costa Rica, Nicaragua and Guatemala. In 2013, the program was aired in Mexico via Gala TV. It was followed by broadcasts in Dominican Republic, Spain, Equatorial Guinea and soon in Cuba.

The church also founded ADDTV in 2014 and launched it as Truth Channel on September 3, 2017. The channel features Itanong mo kay Soriano. In the same year, the church began its 24/7 free-to-air terrestrial broadcast El Camino Antiguo in El Salvador on Canal 61.

On March 4, 2022, the church debuts a new program MCGI Cares on UNTV-37 and on social media hosted by Bro. Daniel Razon.

Satellite broadcast
In 2004, the church tapped GlobeCast to air the TOP Channel in United States and Canada via a direct-to-home satellite broadcast through Galaxy 19, Eutelsat Hotbird 13D and Measat which aims to propagate the program to English-speaking countries including Europe and Asia. In 2010, it was aired in the Philippines via Dream Satellite TV. In 2016, TOP Channel was relaunched as The Truth Channel.

On December 26, 2009, the church launched TV Verdade via Star One C2, SES-6 and Thaicom 5. It primarily airs O Caminho Antigo, the Portuguese version of Ang Dating Daan through local free television channels in Brazil. Currently, the program airs in Minas Gerais, the second most populous state in Brazil, Paraná, Cornélio Procópio. In December 2016, TV Verdade HD was launched in high definition (HD) format (1080p) for households in South and Central America and some parts of North America via SES-6.

In July 2012, the church also launched TV La Verdad, its broadcast channel for Spanish-speaking countries airing via SES-6.

Online media
In 1999, the church joined the World Wide Web when it launched a website called angdatingdaan.org with video streaming feature. Its English version went online in 2005 as theoldpath.tv. The international website of the church went online in 2009 as mcgi.org.

In 2007, Eliseo Soriano published his official blogsite and another blog in 2014. ControversyX is an expository blog, in five languages, which tackles issues about religion. It has more than 4.5 million page views .

In 2014, the church introduced the "MCGI Broadcast App." A short-lived podcast program The Unheard Truth was launched on Google and Spotify until 2021.

Print media
The church distributes print and digital materials for free. It publishes the "TOP Magazine", "Believer Newsmagazine" and a newspaper called "Magandang Balita" (English: Good News). Soriano's online blogs are also compiled and printed as "The Blog Magazine".

The church has also been acknowledged by the Philippine Bible Society as a regular donor and major distribution partner of Tagalog Bibles. Copies of full-length Ang Dating Daan episodes are also distributed in DVD format.

Beliefs
The Members Church of God International believes that the Almighty God, the Father sent his begotten Son, Jesus Christ, instrumental in the establishment of the "Church of God", first planted in Jerusalem and preached by the apostles. They believe that gentile nations, including the Philippines, are partakers of the promise of eternal life through belief in Jesus Christ and the gospel and are not authorized by God to establish their own church, but were members associated with the same "body" or the church written in the gospel by accepting it and executing the doctrines written by the apostles. The church's registered name contains descriptive words "ang mga kaanib" in Tagalog or "members" in English to emphasize the group's association today, as members of the "Church of God" that was already established a long time ago.

For them, the church's primary objective, as commanded by Jesus Christ, is to propagate the gospel to all nations until the consummation of the ages, convert sinners to believe and glorify God and to make them qualify for the eternal life in heaven. They believe in God the Father, Jesus Christ the Son, and the Holy Spirit but they adopt a nontrinitarianism orientation, rejecting the Trinitarian concept that there is "one God in three co-equal persons", which for them is against the Bible. They believe that the Father is greater than all, greater than Jesus Christ as declared by Christ himself. They do not observe customs and traditions which they consider to have pagan origins incompatible with Christianity. Church members prefer to be called and identified as plain "Christians".

God the Father
The Almighty God is also called as "God of Israel" citing , the creator of the universe, with his Son, Jesus Christ. God cannot lie. God is not omniscient (he does not know ahead of time all future human actions and choices), and God is not omnipresent (he created hell but is not there).

The Lord Jesus Christ
He is the only savior of mankind and the only way to the kingdom of God in heaven. He is recognized as the Apostle, High Priest and Mediator of the church. They believe that Christ descended on earth from the bosom of the Father, suffered for the redemption of sin, died on the cross, resurrected after three days, ascended to heaven and sat on the right side of God.

The Holy Spirit
The Holy Spirit is the "comforter" citing , sent by the Father and Christ, to give spiritual happiness and to help the brethren in his or her weaknesses, and to console a believer in times of persecution and trials.

Prayer
Prayer is a basic doctrine in the church. All church gatherings, either spiritual or socio-civic, begin and end with prayers. To encourage its members to pray, the church launched an exclusive 24/7 prayer service website on March 6, 2011, enabling access to continuous singing of praises and hourly community prayer to God. They believe that it is prohibited to pray in public just to be seen. As a discipline, they refrain from showing the act of praying on their television broadcasts, either live or recorded, in public. In November 2013, the church launched a community prayer service on UNTV and Radyo La Verdad 1350 AM. However, only the audio of the community prayer is being aired, to encourage non-brethren to join and participate in praying to God, without necessarily being seen publicly.

Bible
The church believes that only the Bible or the Holy Scriptures, composed of 66 inspired books of the Protestant canon, teaches the full wisdom of God for the salvation of man and that no other books should be used as basis for serving God and Jesus Christ.

The Church of God in the Bible
They believe that God is "calling" those people with determination to serve him, bringing them in his fold, teaching them righteousness after baptism, for their sins to be covered by the priceless blood of Christ poured in Mount Calvary, for the redemption of sin, to make them qualify for life eternal in heaven.

The church mission
The church aims to propagate the gospel on earth until the consummation of the ages. They believe that this effort is geared towards converting sinners to believe and glorify God.

Baptism
Baptism is a key part in their doctrines. Membership is conferred through immersion baptism of adults. Indoctrination classes are required prior to joining the organization. The classes are composed of nine lessons concerning church doctrines prepared by the Overall Servant, Eliseo Soriano. Indoctrinees must fully accept the doctrines taught during the indoctrination before they can be baptized. The church rejects infant baptism. The church conducts mass baptism where listeners who completed the mass indoctrination sessions voluntarily accept the doctrine of the Lord Jesus Christ. Most recent event was conducted last March 17, 2023.

Practices
The congregation meets at least three sessions each week regularly. Gatherings are held in Ang Dating Daan convention centers and monitoring centers, which are typically functional in character, and do not contain religious symbols except for the church logo and reminders for non-members that are prominently displayed.

All gatherings of the church are opened with congregational singing of an opening song, followed by hymns led by the choir and then an opening prayer. After prayer, it follows a reading of chapter or two of the Bible. The subject matter (topic) for most meetings is the same worldwide. After the topic has been delivered, brethren kneel down for closing prayers followed by a doxology and basbas (blessing). When guests or visitors are invited or wish to attend these church gatherings, they are free to stay in their seats.

The members believe that Christians should always attend religious gatherings regularly.

In 2011, a Bible-reading segment was added where a chapter or two of the Bible is being read. Meetings are devoted to the study of a Biblical topic, divided in portions, and will be continued in succeeding meetings.

In March 2020, topic reactions presentation is added where members share what they have learn from the topic of previous gatherings. As part of the doctrine of edifying one another in the Christian love.

Prayer meeting
Prayer meetings are held every Wednesday and Thursday arranged by batches to accommodate all members including visitors. Earliest batch is 4:30 a.m. (Philippine time).

Worship service

Worship services are held during weekend also arranged by batches (every Saturdays and Sunday). The earliest batch is 4:30 a.m. (Philippine time). Unlike prayer meeting, the worship service includes voluntary contributions which is open for members only while suspended members including guests and visitors are strictly prohibited to participate in monetary contributions.

Once in every quarter, the church combines Prayer Meeting and Worship Service in preparation for a three-day International Thanksgiving of the members.

Thanksgiving of God's People
The church offers a weekly "Thanksgiving of God's People", formerly known as "Thanksgiving to God" (Tagalog: "Pasalamat sa Dios"), every Saturdays 5:00 p.m. (PHT).  Brethren who have prepared themselves to offer the sacrifice of thanksgiving will be singing songs of praises live on stage at the ADD Convention Center or at the nearest church local (a coordinating center). Like the worship service, a monetary contribution is conducted voluntarily for members only in the form of hain and gugol. A Biblical topic is delivered in full by the overall servants. The members may also attend replay for viewing purposes the recently concluded Thanksgiving on Sundays (two batches, 6:00 a.m and 5:30 p.m. in Philippine time), Mondays, Tuesdays and Fridays (all at 8:30 a.m. in Philippine time).

Every quarter of each year, the congregation gather for a three-day "International Thanksgiving of God's People" or "Special Pasalamat ng Buong Bayan ng Dios (SPBB)" in Tagalog, formerly called as "International Thanksgiving to God (ITG)" and "Pasalamat ng Katawan (PNK)" (English: "Thanksgiving of the Body"). It has a similar format with the weekly thanksgiving except it allows more time for the Biblical topic and the spiritual consultation. In 2014, South America hosted the church's quarterly event.

For the current year, quarterly thanksgiving are scheduled on the following:
March 24 to 26
July 14 to 16
October 6 to 8
December 22 to 24

Christian New Year
The church celebrates Christian New Year with a special thanksgiving every first day of Nisan, using the Hebrew calendar, which falls between March and April. For the current year, the Christian New Year is scheduled on March 22, 2023.

Lord's supper
The church also commemorates the sacrifice of the Lord Jesus Christ every 13th of Nisan. This is held annually. It also recounts the greatest love and sacrifice of the Lord for humanity. For the current year, the commemoration is yet to be determined.

Feast dedicated to God
The Fiesta ng Dios (Feast Dedicated to God) or simply Ang Dating Daan People's Day is recently launched by the church on February 24, 2019. Church members and visitors, especially the poor and the disabled, who are the feast's special guests, are treated to free sumptuous meals, entertainment, and fun activities. The celebration aims to spread God's love through the joyous occasion. On November 24, 2019, MCGI held another feast event to culminate the celebration of Ang Dating Daan's 39th year anniversary on airwaves.

Mass indoctrination
A series of sessions where the doctrines of Jesus Christ are preached to those who are interested to become members of the church. Baptism will follow when a person accepts the teachings. The next sessions will start on March 27th and expected to be completed by April 14th.

Bible exposition
A unique program that gives answers to questions about life, religion and faith. It is presented in many languages broadcast via satellite and in social media platforms.

Bible study
A biblical talk aims to help people learn the Bible with an assigned topic. It also corrects false belief and concepts about the holy scriptures.

Global prayer for humanity
The church started its Global prayer for humanity in response to the ongoing COVID-19. It was an initiative by Bro. Eli Soriano where anyone around the world can join to pray to God at the same time. It was stated on May 25, 2020, at 9:30 am eastern time.

Serbisyong kapatiran
In July 2020, Serbisyong kapatiran is launched. It is initially broadcast live on an Instagram private account exclusive for brethren access. The program eventually grows and showcases Story of My Faith, Kristiano Drama, video greetings and picture-taking, singing of church hymns and songs and more. It airs weekdays at 9:30 pm in the Philippines.

Architecture

 
Currently, the Members Church of God International is present in six inhabited continents of the world with more than 1,360 established local congregations. Convention and coordinating centers serve as places of worship where members congregate themselves.

Convention centers
The 10-hectare Ang Dating Daan (ADD) compound in Apalit, Pampanga is the church's headquarters in the Philippines. It houses the ADD Convention Center where major church gatherings are held and the chapel, a multipurpose venue for the community prayer, indoctrination sessions, prayer meetings and worship services. Other structures inside the compound include the baptistry, administration office, museum, transient home, orphanages, mini-hospital, dormitories for church officers and volunteers, houses for church ministers and workers and school buildings of La Verdad Christian College.

There are also other convention centers located in Batangas, Laguna and Brazil.

Coordinating centers
The church has established more than a 1,360 local congregations. These venues are also called the Ang Dating Daan Coordinating Centers or MCGI Satellite Monitoring Centers. It is where the brethren meet to attend church gatherings and host indoctrination sessions. Most of the sites are rented spaces in urban and rural communities in the Philippines and abroad. These centers are equipped with C-band satellite dish antenna and high-speed broadband connection, these sites are able to receive real-time broadcast feeds emanating from the headquarters. Assigned church workers and officers oversee activities at locale chapters and receive queries regarding membership in the church. In 2012, a mobile coordinating center was launched including livelihood academy. A bus transformed into a cozy venue with roof, chairs, television screen and satellite receiver, can accommodate guests in remote areas during Bible Expositions.

Walk of faith fountain
The church's Walk of Faith water fountain features a series of stone tablets inscribed with the names of heroes of faith and their most well-known acts recorded in the Bible. It was inaugurated on April 30, 2018, after a thanksgiving event.

MCGI Chapel
On May 7, 2019, the church inaugurates two additional facilities inside the MCGI Compound in Apalit, Pampanga. The New Administration Building and the MCGI Chapel and Multi-Purpose Hall.

Music 
On June 28, 2020, MCGI launches a 24-hour livestream of spiritual and praise songs through Youtube. It aims for members to have easier access to the originally composed songs and hymns that they can listen via the Internet.

Music ministry
MCGI's music ministry leads members in the singing of hyms during church gatherings.

Theater ministry
MCGI's theater ministry or teatro kristiano consists of youth members of the church who are focused in the performing arts through dance choreographies. They complement hyms and songs of praise in the church gathering or events.

MCGI symphony orchestra
MCGI has an orchestra of more than 200 musicians. They regularly play during church events including concerts. Musicians play the following instrument families: strings, winds, brass and percussion. The orchestra also includes rhythm instruments and bass.

MCGI music school
It aims to educate people for potential musical talents via virtual class being done by professional music-makers. Programs include voice lessons including instruments like piano, guitar, violin, drum, flute, cello, clarinet, trumpet and trombone.

Records

Largest gospel choir

On October 12, 2015, Members Church of God International set the Guinness World Record as the "Largest Gospel Choir" in the world, as part of the 35th anniversary celebration of the Ang Dating Daan (The Old Path) religious program in radio and television broadcasting. The official video of the performance was published in The Old Path YouTube channel with 1.6 million views .

Guinness adjudicator Fortuna Burke Melhem witnessed the recital of 8,688 singers at the Smart Araneta Coliseum in Cubao, Quezon City. The Ang Dating Daan Chorale performed a 15-minute medley of original MCGI Christian praise music compositions, entitled "Stand Up," "Praise the Name," "Hallelujah, Amen," and "Enrich the Spirit."

MCGI donated more than three million pesos for people with disabilities (PWD) who were invited as main guests during the event. Beneficiaries were government-accredited charitable institutions and federations for PWDs and more than 1,700 PWD guests and their families.

It surpassed the previous 4,745-singer record achieved by the Iglesia ni Cristo (INC) in 2014. However on May 22, 2016, the INC regained the record with 21,262 singers at the Philippine Arena.

Top blood donor
The church partnered with government agencies such as the Philippine Blood Center and New Zealand Blood Service and humanitarian organizations including Philippine Red Cross and Singapore Red Cross.

For eight consecutive year, the church received "Jose Rizal Award" (Gawad Jose Rizal) from the Philippine Blood Center and the Department of Health (DOH) during the Dugong Bayani Awards 2019. It is the highest recognition given by the DOH to an organization that conducted mobile blood donation activities and accumulated more than 2,000 blood units. MCGI donated the most among all participants with 5,801 blood bags given to the Philippine Blood Center in 2019. In 2018, MCGI received the same award with 6,710 donated blood bags.

On June 29, 2019, Singapore Red Cross has accorded MCGI with its third Gold Award as one of its blood-mobile organization partner, for sharing a total of 500 blood units in 2018, during Blood Donors Recognition Ceremony held at Downtown East.

In 2014, MCGI was recognized by Philippine Red Cross as top donor under religious groups category held at La Parilla Hotel, in Cabanatuan City, Nueva Ecija.

In June 2012, included in the list of recipients from MCGI live donors was the late Rodolfo Vera Quizon Sr., popularly known as the Philippines' "Comedy King" Dolphy where a member with B+ blood type donated blood and plasma.

Notable members

Jameson Blake – a Filipino-American actor, dancer, and model.
Joshua Dionisio – a former Filipino actor.
Lou Veloso – a Filipino actor, comedian, director and politician.
Nora Aunor – a Filipina actress, recording artist, and film producer.
Vivian Velez – a Filipina actress and currently serving as Director General of Film Academy of the Philippines.
Zoren Legaspi – a Filipino actor and television director.

See also
Eli Soriano
Daniel Razon

References

Notes

Citations

External links

Official websites 
Members Church of God International
MCGI Community Prayer
MCGI Music School

Official social media accounts 
MCGI's Official Social Media and Websites

 
Christian denominations founded in the Philippines
Nontrinitarian denominations